Birdlife may refer to:

 Bird, a winged, egg-laying, vertebrate animal.
 Bird Life, a book on Australian birds.
 BirdLife International (BLI), an international conservation organisation with national partners around the world
 BirdLife Australia, BLI national partner
 BirdLife Cyprus, BLI national partner
 BirdLife Malta, BLI national partner
 BirdLife South Africa, BLI national partner
 SOS/BirdLife Slovakia, BLI national partner

See also
 List of Birdlife International national partner organisations